Harcanville is a commune in the Seine-Maritime department in the Normandy region in northern France.

Geography
It is very close to the section of Secantan.

Population

Places of interest
 The church of St.Jean & St.Clair, dating from the eleventh century.
 A feudal motte.
 A sixteenth-century fortified manor house, now part of a farm.
 The eighteenth-century Manoir de Pichemont.

See also
Communes of the Seine-Maritime department

References

Communes of Seine-Maritime